is a Japanese voice actress from Kanagawa Prefecture, Japan.

Filmography

Anime
The Ancient Magus' Bride – Lizbeth Sergeant 
Another – Amane
Fruits Basket: 2nd season (2020) - Mayuko's Mother (ep 12)
The Brave of Gold Goldran – Serious Walzac/Serious Izak
Black Butler – Ludia, Queen Victoria (Season 1)
Fastening Days – Anna
Les Misérables: Shōjo Cosette – Mother Innocente
Muteki Kanban Musume – Onimaru Makiko
Rent-A-Girlfriend – Sayuri Ichinose
Yakitate!! Japan – Old Lady (ep 57)
Life Lessons with Uramichi Oniisan – Sayuri
Ultra Nyan: Hoshizora Kara Maiorita Fushigi Neko (1997) (Anko)
Ultra Nyan 2: Happy Daisakusen (movie) (1998) (Anko)
Yurei Deco – Madam 44

Video games
Baten Kaitos: Eternal Wings and the Lost Ocean – Barnette
Shenmue – Xia Xiu Yu

Dubbing

Live-action
Amélie (Gina (Clotilde Mollet))
The Angriest Man in Brooklyn (Bette Altmann (Melissa Leo))
Annie: A Royal Adventure! (Mrs. Fowler (Ann Morrish))
Bloodline (Sally Rayburn (Sissy Spacek))
Dangerous Minds (Carla Nichols (Robin Bartlett))
Dune (Shadout Mapes (Golda Rosheuvel))
EDtv (Jeanette Pekurny (Sally Kirkland))
Final Destination 2 (Nora Carpenter (Lynda Boyd))
Frank Herbert's Children of Dune (Princess Wensicia (Susan Sarandon))
Friends with Money (Jane (Frances McDormand))
From Russia with Love (Rosa Klebb (Lotte Lenya))
Gossip Girl (Celia Rhodes (Caroline Lagerfelt))
Henry Poole Is Here (Esperanza Martinez (Adriana Barraza))
I, Tonya (LaVona Golden (Allison Janney))
John Carter (Sarkoja (Polly Walker))
Last Night in Soho (Margaret "Peggy" Turner (Rita Tushingham))
Little House on the Prairie (2019 NHK BS4K edition) (Harriet Oleson (Katherine MacGregor))
Lock, Stock and Two Smoking Barrels (Tanya (Vera Day))
Moonfall (Mrs. Elaine Houseman (Kathleen Fee))
Moonlight Mile (Jojo Floss (Susan Sarandon))
Oz (Sister Peter Marie Reimondo (Rita Moreno))
Paddington (Mrs. Bird (Julie Walters))
Paddington 2 (Mrs. Bird (Julie Walters))
Platoon (2003 TV Tokyo edition) (Old Woman)
Professor Marston and the Wonder Women (Josette Frank (Connie Britton))
The Rainmaker (Dot Black (Mary Kay Place))
The Resident (Lane Hunter (Melina Kanakaredes))
Silent Hill (Dahlia Gillespie (Deborah Kara Unger))
Silent Hill: Revelation (Dahlia Gillespie (Deborah Kara Unger))
Somewhere in Time (2021 BS Tokyo edition) (Laura Roberts (Teresa Wright))
Speed 2: Cruise Control (Debbie (Colleen Camp))
Transformers: Dark of the Moon (Charlotte Mearing (Frances McDormand))
United 93 (Deborah Welsh (Polly Adams))
Wayward Pines (Pamela Pilcher (Melissa Leo))
Willy's Wonderland (Sheriff Eloise Lund (Beth Grant))

Animation
The Angry Birds Movie (Shirley)
Batman Beyond (Commissioner Barbara Gordon)
Batman Beyond: Return of the Joker (Commissioner Barbara Gordon)
Cars 3 (Miss Fritter)
Coraline (Mrs. Lovat)
Corpse Bride (Hildegarde)
Finding Nemo (Peach)
Finding Dory (Peach)
The Good Dinosaur (Lurleane)
Hotel Transylvania (Gremlin)
Inside Out (Mom's Anger)
Ralph Breaks the Internet (Ebay Elayne)
Soul (Libba Gardner)
Turning Red (Wu)

References

External links
Official agency profile 

1955 births
Living people
Japanese video game actresses
Japanese voice actresses
Tamagawa University alumni
Voice actresses from Kanagawa Prefecture
20th-century Japanese actresses
21st-century Japanese actresses